Sankt Roman, (Bavarian: Sonkt Roma or just Roma) officially St. Roman, is a municipality in the district of Schärding in the Austrian state of Upper Austria.

Geography
Sankt Roman lies on the south side of the Sau forest. About 38 percent of the municipality is forest, and 57 percent is farmland.

References

Cities and towns in Schärding District